Stephen Yale-Loehr (born 10 June 1954),
is an American law professor and immigration law attorney. Yale-Loehr earned his undergraduate and law degrees from Cornell University in 1977 and 1981, respectively.  He was editor-in-chief of the Cornell International Law Journal during his time at the law school. Upon graduating he clerked for Judge Howard G. Munson of the U.S. District Court, Northern District of New York. Yale-Loehr has been a member of the Cornell Law faculty since 1991.

Early life

Stephen Yale-Loehr was born to Raymond C. Loehr and Amy J. Yale, daughter of Dr. Daniel Yale. His mother Amy was a radiologist in Ithaca, New York, and his father was Chairman of the Science Advisory Board and Head of the Environmental Studies Program at Cornell University.

Career

Yale-Loehr practices and teaches U.S. immigration law.  He is Professor of Immigration Law Practice at Cornell Law School and serves as counsel for the firm Miller Mayer in Ithaca, New York.  From 1986 to 1994 he served as managing and executive editor, respectively, of two immigration law publications: Interpreter Releases   Immigration Briefings.  For 10 years he co-authored a bi-monthly immigration column for the New York Law Journal. He also founded and was the first executive director of Invest In the USA, a trade association for the EB-5 visa Regional Center Program.

Yale-Loehr has frequently testified before Congress relating to EB-5, L-1 and H1-B visas and other immigration related topics. He is frequently quoted in the media, including NPR, The New York Times, ABC News, USA Today, CNN, Los Angeles Times, Fortune, Time, Financial Times, Bloomberg CBC News, Reuters, Marketplace, Univsion, Chronicle of Higher Education, The Hill, the Houston Chronicle, the Washington Post,  the San Francisco Chronicle, the Dallas Morning News, the NY Daily News, Vox, the Associated Press, the Wall Street Journal, Slate, and CBS News.

He was also interviewed regarding the United States v. Texas Supreme Court decision in 2016, regarding the constitutionality of President Obama's executive action creating the Deferred Action for Parents of Americans (DAPA) program.

Yale Loehr was the 2001 recipient of the American Immigration Lawyers Association's Elmer Fried Award for excellence in teaching and the 2004 winner of American Immigration Lawyers Association's Edith Lowenstein Award for excellence in advancing the practice of immigration law. He is also a Fellow of the American Bar Foundation, a Nonresident Fellow at the Migration Policy Institute, and a founding member of the Alliance of Business Immigration Lawyers.

Books
He is co-author of the 21-volume treatise Immigration Law and Procedure  which is considered one of the standard reference works in the field and is often cited in U.S. Supreme Court and other federal court case opinions. His other published books and publications include:
 Co-author, A Realistic Road to a Points-Tested Visa Program in the United States (2020)
Co-author, Immigration And Nationality Law: Problems And Strategies (2d ed. 2019)
 Editor, Global Business Immigration Practice Guide (2012)
 S. Amrhein, A. Lindquist, L. Danielson & S. Yale-Loehr, Green Card Stories (2012)
 Co-author, Secure Borders, Open Doors: Visa Procedures In The Post-September 11 Era (2005)
 Co-author, America’s Challenge: Domestic Security, Civil Liberties, And National Unity After September 11 (2003)
 C. Gordon, S. Mailman, S. Yale-Loehr & R. Wada, Immigration Law And Procedure 
 D. Papademetriou & S. Yale-Loehr, Balancing Interests: Rethinking U.S. Selection Of Skilled Immigrants (1996)
 S. Yale-Loehr, Understanding The Immigration Act Of 1990 (1991)
 M. Roberts & S. Yale-Loehr, Understanding The 1986 Immigration Law (1987)

References

External links 
http://www.stephenyaleloehr.com
http://www.lawschool.cornell.edu/faculty/bio_stephen_yale-loehr.cfm
https://millermayer.com/lawyers-ithaca/steve-yale-loehr-immigration-law/

1954 births
Living people
20th-century American lawyers
Cornell University alumni
Cornell Law School faculty
21st-century American lawyers